Clifton Skeen (March 17, 1927 – January 30, 1993) was a former member of the Ohio House of Representatives.

References

External links

1927 births
1993 deaths
Democratic Party members of the Ohio House of Representatives
People from Richwood, West Virginia
20th-century American politicians